Anantnag Assembly constituency is one of the 87 constituencies in the Jammu and Kashmir Legislative Assembly of Jammu and Kashmir a north state of India. Anantnag is also part of Anantnag Lok Sabha constituency.

In 2008 Jammu and Kashmir Legislative Assembly election, Mufti Mohammad Sayeed of Jammu and Kashmir Peoples Democratic Party won the seat and retained it in 2014 and became Chief Ministers of Jammu and Kashmir.In 1977 Mirza Afzal Beg won the seat and became the first Deputy Chief Minister of Jammu and Kashmir. His son Mirza Mehboob Beg won this seat twice in 1983 and 2002 . Mirza Mehboob Beg also served as the Health Minister .

Member of Legislative Assembly
 1951 : Mirza Afzal Beg, Jammu & Kashmir National Conference
 1962: Shamasuddin, Indian National Congress
 1967: Shamasuddin, Indian National Congress
 1972: Shamasuddin, Indian National Congress
 1974: Mirza Afzal Beg, Jammu & Kashmir National Conference
 1977: Mirza Afzal Beg, Jammu & Kashmir National Conference
 1983: Mirza Mehboob Beg, Jammu & Kashmir National Conference
 1987: Mohammad Syeed Shah,  Independent
 1996: Safdar Ali Beg, Jammu & Kashmir National Conference
 2002: Dr. Mirza Mehboob Beg, Jammu and Kashmir National Conference 
 2008: Mufti Mohammad Sayeed, Jammu and Kashmir Peoples Democratic Party
 2014: Mufti Mohammad Sayeed, Jammu and Kashmir Peoples Democratic Party

Election results

2016 bye-election

2014

See also
 Anantnag
 List of constituencies of Jammu and Kashmir Legislative Assembly

References

Assembly constituencies of Jammu and Kashmir
Anantnag